The 1978 Preakness Stakes was the 103rd running of the $210,000 Grade 1 Preakness Stakes thoroughbred horse race. The race took place on May 20, 1978, and was televised in the United States on the ABC television network. Affirmed, who was jockeyed by Steve Cauthen, won the race by a head over runner-up Alydar, repeating Affirmed's close victory over Alydar in the Kentucky Derby.  Believe It finished 3rd, repeating his result from the Kentucky Derby. Approximate post time was 5:41 p.m. Eastern Time. The race was run on a fast track in a final time of 1:54-2/5.  The Maryland Jockey Club reported total attendance of 81,261, this is recorded as second highest on the list of American thoroughbred racing top attended events for North America in 1978.

Longshot Track reward took the lead early, but Affirmed took the lead entering the backstretch.  Alydar had remained fairly close to the leaders and almost caught up to Affirmed entering the stretch.  But Affirmed never let Alydar catch up, and won by a neck.  3rd place Believe It finished 7 1/2 lengths behind.

Payout 

The 103rd Preakness Stakes Payout Schedule

$2 Exacta:  (6–3) paid   $4.00

The full chart 

 Winning Breeder: Harbor View Farm; (FL)
 Winning Time: 1:54 2/5
 Track Condition: Fast
 Total Attendance: 81,261

References

External links 

 

1978
1978 in horse racing
Horse races in Maryland
1978 in American sports
1978 in sports in Maryland